The Trotskyist International Liaison Committee was the international organisation established by the Workers Socialist League in Britain (of which Alan Thornett was the best-known member) and its international co-thinkers in Italy, Denmark, the US and Turkey.  It was founded in 1979.

Following the WSL's fusion with the International-Communist League in 1981, clear but informal factional lines developed in the WSL.  Most of the parties in the TILC sympathised with the Internationalist Faction in the WSL.  WSL delegates voted at the 1983 TILC group to prevent Chilean sympathisers from affiliating; the WSL then walked out after a resolution calling on Alan Thornett to fight Sean Matgamna's "revisionism".  The IF who sympathised with the TILC were then expelled from the WSL, and formed the Workers Internationalist League.  However, this group soon split, and in 1984, the TILC was also disbanded. However, a group of former WIL members  established the Revolutionary Internationalist League (RIL) in 1984.  The majority of the TILC sections (Italy, US, UK, Denmark) regrouped as the International Trotskyist Committee (ITC).

Thornett and his co-thinkers were also later expelled from the WSL and established the Socialist Group which later merged with the International Group to form the International Socialist Group as the British section of the reunified Fourth International.

Its American affiliate was the Revolutionary Workers League which was established by a group of comrades who studied the Spartacist League but had a number of differences that prevented them from joining.  It remained with the TILC through the  time of the Falkland Islands War in 1982, but was gravitating to the Morenoist faction of the Fourth International by the mid-1980s. In the summer of 1984, members of the RWL participated in the founding conference of the International Trotskyist Committee for the Political Regeneration of the Fourht International (ITC).

References

See also 
International Trotskyist Opposition
Website of the International Trotskyist Committee (ITC) https://www.itc4.org/

Trotskyist political internationals